Perigaster is a genus of minute seed weevils in the beetle family Curculionidae. There are about seven described species in Perigaster.

Species
These seven species belong to the genus Perigaster:
 Perigaster alternans Blatchley, 1928 i c
 Perigaster cretura (Herbst, 1797) i c g b
 Perigaster liturata (Dietz, 1896) i
 Perigaster lituratus Buchanan, 1937 c
 Perigaster longirostris Buchanan, 1931 c
 Perigaster obscura (LeConte, 1876) i b
 Perigaster tetracantha Champion, c
Data sources: i = ITIS, c = Catalogue of Life, g = GBIF, b = Bugguide.net

References

Further reading

 
 
 

Curculionidae
Articles created by Qbugbot